= Gorau Chwarae Cyd Chwarae =

Single by Y Canol Cae
- Language: Welsh and English
- English title: Best Play is Fair Play
- Released: July 30, 2026
- Length: 2:19
- Producer: Football Association of Wales

"Gorau Chwarae Cyd Chwarae" (English: Best Play is Team Play) is a song recorded by Ifan Pritchard (under the name Y Canol Cae) released on 30 July 2026. It serves as the official anthem of the Cymru Premier.
